Hemidactylus funaiolii, also known commonly as the Archer's Post gecko and the Kenya leaf-toed gecko, is a species of lizard in the family Gekkonidae. The species is native to East Africa.

Etymology
The specific name, funaiolii, is in honor of Italian zoologist Ugo Funaioli.

Geographic range
H. funaiolii is found from Somalia to central Kenya.

Habitat

Description
H. funaiolii is a small species for its genus. The dorsal surface of the body is covered with uniform keeled scales which are strongly imbricate.

Reproduction
H. funaiolii is oviparous.

References

Further reading
Lanza B (1978). "On some new or interesting East African amphibians and reptiles". Monitore Zoologico Italiano, Supplemento 10 (1): 229–297. (Hemidactylus funaiolii, new species, p. 271). (in English, with an abstract in Italian).
Rösler H (2000). "Kommentierte Liste der rezent, subrezent und fossil bekannten Geckotaxa (Reptilia: Gekkonomorpha)". Gekkota 2: 28–153. (Hemidactylus funaiolii, p. 86). (in German).
Spawls S, Howell K, Hinkel H, Menegon M (2018). Field Guide to East African Reptiles, Second Edition. London: Bloomsbury Natural History. 624 pp. . (Hemidactylus funaiolii, p. 88).

Hemidactylus
Reptiles described in 1978
Reptiles of Kenya
Reptiles of Somalia